.cxx is a file extension for C++ files.

CXX may also refer to:

 120 (number) or CXX in Roman Numerals
 AD 120
 No. 120 Squadron RAF
 Sonnet CXX, a sonnet by William Shakespeare
 Canto CXX, a canto of the epic poem The Cantos by Ezra Pound
 C++, the programming language, alternately rendered as "Cxx"
 CX-X, a cargo plane program that resulted in the Lockheed C-5 Galaxy

See also
 120 (disambiguation)
 CX (disambiguation)
 CCX (disambiguation)
 c2x, a C programming language standard